Glenn M. Dixon (July 11, 1908 – June 2, 1992) was an American Negro league outfielder in the 1930s.

A native of Little Rock, Arkansas, Dixon played for the St. Louis Stars in 1937. In nine recorded games, he posted four hits in 32 plate appearances. Dixon died in Sikeston, Missouri in 1992 at age 83.

References

External links
 and Seamheads 
 Glenn Dixon at Arkansas Baseball Encyclopedia

1908 births
1992 deaths
St. Louis Stars (1937) players
Baseball outfielders
Baseball players from Arkansas
Sportspeople from Little Rock, Arkansas
20th-century African-American sportspeople